Naw Bahar District is a district of Zabul province in southern Afghanistan.

Demographics 
Naw Bahar has a population of about 18,300 as of 2013. The district is mostly populated by the Tokhi tribe of Ghilji Pashtuns.

See also 
 Districts of Afghanistan

References

External links 

Districts of Zabul Province